Jordan Timothy Heading (born January 30, 1996) is a Filipino basketball player for Nagasaki Velca of the B2 League.

Early life and education
Jordan Heading was born on January 30, 1996in Adelaide to an Australian father and a Filipino mother. He attended the Morrison Academy Kaohsiung in Taiwan for his high school studies, before going to the United States, to enter the California Baptist University in Riverside, California to pursue a degree in kinesiology.

College career
Heading played for the California Baptist University (CBU) Lancers in college as a  starting point guard. He was named a member of the Academic All-Pacific West five team.

Professional career

San Miguel Alab Pilipinas (2019–2020) 
Heading started his professional career with San Miguel Alab Pilipinas of the ASEAN Basketball League joining the team in October 2019. The COVID-19 pandemic led to the cancellation of the 2019–20 season, consequentially also ending his stint with Alab.

In the Season 46 draft of the Philippine Basketball Association (PBA) in March 2021, Heading was selected by the Terrafirma Dyip as the top pick for the special Gilas Pilipinas draft. He was to be loaned to the Philippine national team before he could suit up for Terrafirma. He would join the Taichung Wagor Suns of Taiwan in October 2022. This raised some concern with Heading's contract with the Samahang Basketbol ng Pilipinas, the Philippine basketball federation, which was supposed to be active until March 2023 arising from his involvement the special PBA draft.

Taichung Wagor Suns (2021–2022) 
Heading went on to play for Taichung Wagor Suns. Heading's stint with the Suns covered its 2021–22 season, the Suns' first in the T1 League of Taiwan. The team finished as runners-up for that season.

Nagasaki Velca (2022–present) 
On July 1, 2022, he joined the Nagasaki Velca which competes in the 2nd division of Japan's B.League.

National team career
Heading has played for the Philippine national team. Having obtained his Philippine passport before the age of 16, Heading is eligible to play for the Philippines as a local and non-naturalized player under FIBA eligibility rules despite him being born outside the Philippines and having non-Filipino heritage.

He has played in the Philippine national youth system, having took part in the 2011 FIBA Asia Under-16 Championship in Vietnan.

Heading was part of the Philippine senior team which took part in the Belgrade tournament of the 2020 FIBA Men's Olympic Qualifiers.

Heading would be committed to the senior national team when he got picked by the Terrafirma Dyip in the special Gilas Pilipinas draft of the March 2021 PBA draft. However contractual issues arose when he joined the Taichun Suns in October 2021. The issue would be resolved and Heading would return to play for the Philippines in the February 2023 window of the 2023 FIBA Basketball World Cup Asia qualifier.

Personal life
Heading is married to Lauren, an American professional volleyball player since 2019. They first met each other at California Baptist University where they both studied.

Notes

References

External links
California Baptist Lancers bio

1996 births
Living people
Australian expatriate basketball people in Japan
Australian expatriate basketball people in Taiwan
Australian expatriate basketball people in the United States
Australian men's basketball players
Australian people of Filipino descent
California Baptist Lancers men's basketball players
Citizens of the Philippines through descent
Filipino expatriate basketball people in Japan
Filipino expatriate basketball people in Taiwan
Filipino expatriate basketball people in the United States
Filipino men's 3x3 basketball players
Filipino men's basketball players
Philippines men's national basketball team players
Nagasaki Velca players
Shooting guards
Sportspeople from Adelaide
Taichung Wagor Suns players
T1 League Asian imports
Terrafirma Dyip draft picks